Domingos Lampariello Neto (born March 7, 1961), known as Domingos Maracanã, is a Brazilian former volleyball player who competed in the 1984 Summer Olympics and in the 1988 Summer Olympics.

In 1984 he was part of the Brazilian team which won the silver medal in the Olympic tournament. He played five matches.

Four years later he finished fourth with the Brazilian team in the 1988 Olympic tournament. He played all seven matches.

External links
 

1961 births
Living people
Brazilian men's volleyball players
Olympic volleyball players of Brazil
Volleyball players at the 1984 Summer Olympics
Volleyball players at the 1988 Summer Olympics
Olympic silver medalists for Brazil
Olympic medalists in volleyball
Medalists at the 1984 Summer Olympics
Pan American Games medalists in volleyball
Pan American Games bronze medalists for Brazil
Pan American Games gold medalists for Brazil
Medalists at the 1983 Pan American Games
Medalists at the 1987 Pan American Games